The 1889 Massachusetts gubernatorial election was held on November 5, 1889. Incumbent Republican Governor Oliver Ames did not run for re-election to a fourth term in office. He was succeeded by his Lt. Governor John Q. A. Brackett, who defeated Democratic Mayor of Cambridge William Russell.

General election

Results

See also
 1889 Massachusetts legislature

References

Governor
1889
Massachusetts
November 1889 events